The following are the national records in athletics in Saint Kitts and Nevis maintained by the country's national athletics federation: Saint Kitts & Nevis Amateur Athletic Association (SKNAAA).

Outdoor

Key to tables:

+ = en route to a longer distance

ht = hand timing

A = affected by altitude

X = not recognised because of doping violation

y = denotes 880 yards

OT = oversized track (> 200m in circumference)

Men

Women

Indoor

Men

Women

Notes

See also
Saint Kitts and Nevis national athletics team

References

External links
SKNAAA web site

Saint Kitts and Nevis
Records
Athletics